The  is a Japanese commuter electric multiple unit (EMU) train type operated by the private railway operator Tokyu Corporation in the Tokyo area of Japan. Introduced into service in March 1986, 14 eight-car sets and a five-car set were built between 1986 and 1991 by Tokyu Car Corporation for use on the Tokyu Toyoko and Oimachi lines. Between 2009 and 2013, the 9000 series sets allocated to Toyoko Line operations were transferred to the Oimachi Line.

Design 
While they retain the stainless steel bodies used by older Tokyu train types, they have an offset front-end door. In addition, the 9000 series was the first train type to use variable-frequency drive (more commonly referred to as VVVF) technology from new. Since its introduction in 1986, all subsequent Tokyu train types would implement the technology.

The design of the 9000 series was the basis for the later Tokyu 1000 series and 2000 series train types.

Formations

Toyoko Line 
The Toyoko Line fleet consisted of 14 eight-car sets, formed as follows.

 The motored cars were each fitted with one lozenge-type pantograph.

Oimachi Line 
Oimachi Line sets are formed as follows.

 Cars 2, 3, and 4 are each fitted with one single-arm pantograph.

Interior 
Passenger accommodation consists primarily of longitudinal seating. Priority seating is composed of transverse seating bays.

History 
The 9000 series fleet consists of 117 vehicles which were built by Tokyu Car Corporation. Construction commenced in 1986 and continued until 1991. The vehicles were initially formed into 14 eight-car sets and a five-car set, numbered 9001 to 9015. The train type first entered service on the Tokyu Toyoko Line in March 1986, and the sole five-car set (9007) was introduced on the Tokyu Oimachi Line in 1988.

Refurbishment 
From fiscal 2004, the 9000 series fleet underwent a programme of interior refurbishment. The programme included the removal of intermediate partitions in favor of stanchion poles for seven-person seats, installation of onboard passenger information displays, and replacement of the original mixture of brown and orange seat moquette. The seat backs received patterned moquette, whereas the seats received plain red moquette.

Transfer to the Tokyu Oimachi Line 

Set 9007 was the only 9000 series trainset on the Oimachi Line until July 2009, when eight-car set 9002 was transferred from Motosumiyoshi depot to Nagatsuta depot for use on the line. It was shortened to a five-car formation, and its solid-red front-end bands were replaced with ones with a red-to-orange gradient. The rest of the fleet was transferred and modified as such from then, with the last of these sets—9001, 9005, and 9010—being withdrawn from Toyoko Line operations between 14 and 15 March 2013. They were transferred to Nagatsuta shortly thereafter.

Special liveries 
A 9000 series set is due to receive a special livery to commemorate the 100th anniversary of Tokyu Corporation's founding. The set is due to enter service with the commemorative livery on 29 April 2022.

References 

Electric multiple units of Japan
9000
Train-related introductions in 1986
Tokyu Car multiple units
1500 V DC multiple units of Japan